Mongolia participated in the 2014 Asian Games in Incheon, South Korea from 19 September to 4 October 2014.

Medal summary

Medals by sport

Medalists

Boxing

Basketball

Judo

Shooting

Wrestling

References

External links
incheon2014ag.org - Athletes
incheon2014ag.org - Mongolia

Nations at the 2014 Asian Games
2014
Asian Games